Khorram Bisheh (also Romanized as Khorram Bīsheh) is a village in Rud Pish Rural District, in the Central District of Fuman County, Gilan Province, Iran. At the 2006 census, its population was 303, in 91 families.

References 

Populated places in Fuman County